Al Baker (September 4, 1874 – October 24, 1951) was a professional magician. Al Baker was an inventor of many tricks that he marketed including his Dictionary Test, Al Baker Slates and his version of the Rice bowls. Many of his silk magic effects were included in Rice's Encyclopedia of Silk Magic. Al Baker opened a magic shop with Martin Sunshine in Times Square. Al Baker also regularly contributed to The Sphinx and other magic magazines.

Biography
He was born on September 4, 1874, in Poughkeepsie, New York.

Al Baker was known by most of his magical contemporaries as an outstanding M.C., author, and inventor. By the time he was 21 was working in vaudeville as magician and ventriloquist. Though he was a performer at Coney Island as the Chautauqua & Lyceum headliner, he also had a photo studio there.

He was Dean of the Society of American Magicians from 1941 to 1951.

In 1951 Al Baker wrote a book called Pet Secrets, where he had the American mystery writer, Clayton Rawson draw all his illustrations.

He died on October 24, 1951.

Legacy
Al Baker's dry humor and tongue in cheek approach to his advice to other magicians is timeless. Al Baker was once quoted saying, "No matter how bad the show, or how little the kids, or how hard it is to get their attention, take a live rabbit and coil of paper out of your hat and you're safe."

Published works

 Al Bakers' Book One (1933)
 Al Baker's Book Two (1935)
 Magical Ways and Means (1941)
 Mental Magic (1949)
 Pet Secrets (1951)

Manuscripts
 The Twenty-Five Dollar Manuscript (Ca. 1929)
 Al Baker's Pack (1932)
 Cardially Yours (1934)
 THOUGHT TRANSCRIPTIONS by AL.Baker Jan 11th (1938)
 Effects 1, 2, 3 (Ca. 1939)
 Card Trio (1948)

Compilations
 The Secret Ways of Al Baker by Miracle Factory Books (2003)

See also
 List of magicians
 Coin Magic
 Sleight of hand
 Mentalists

References

 M-U-M magazine, September 1982.
 Genii Forum Book of the Month

External links
 
 Al Baker MagicPedia entry
 Al Baker Biography
 Story about Al Baker

1874 births
1951 deaths
American magicians
Card magic
Coin magic
Mentalists
Sleight of hand
Vaudeville performers